WWSD (1230 AM) was a radio station that broadcast an Urban Contemporary format. Formerly licensed to Quincy, Florida, United States, the station served the Tallahassee area. The station was owned by Tuff-Starr Jam Communication, Inc.

The station's license was cancelled and its call sign deleted by the Federal Communications Commission on February 3, 2012.

References

External links

WSD
Radio stations disestablished in 2012
Defunct radio stations in the United States
Radio stations established in 1979
1979 establishments in Florida
2012 disestablishments in Florida
WSD